Oti Fossae is a group of fossae (troughs) in the Phoenicis Lacus quadrangle on Mars, located at 9.3° S and 116.8° W.  It is 370 km long and was named after a classical albedo feature.

References 

Valleys and canyons on Mars
Phoenicis Lacus quadrangle